Ihor Ihorovych Zhurakhovskyi (born 19 September 1994) is a Ukrainian professional football midfielder who plays for German NOFV-Oberliga Nord club Rostocker FC.

Zhurakhovskyi is a product of Sports School #15 Kyiv. Made his debut for FC Metalurh entering as a second time playing against FC Metalurh Donetsk on 11 May 2014 in Ukrainian Premier League.

Early life
Ihor Zhurakhovskyi was born in Kyiv. From his early years play football. The pupil football sports school №15 in Kiev. Besides football actively engaged in football freestyle. Three times (2009, 2012, 2013) participated in national competitions Red Bull Street Style. All three times was among the Top8.

Club career

Since the season 2013/14 he is a player of FC Metallurg Zaporozhye. On 12 September 2013, he made his debut in the Metallurg U-21 in the home match against Chernomorets Odessa. In total, he played for Metallurg U-21 played 12 games (1 goal) in the Ukrainian Championship among youth teams of the season 2013/14. In the spring of 2014, he began to train with the first team Metallurg. On 11 May 2014, he made his debut for the first team in the Premier League away match in the 29th round against Metallurg Donetsk(0:2), coming on as substitute in the 82nd minute of the match.

Before the start of the season 2014/15 for the first time took part in pre-season training camp of the basic structure. In preparation he played 6 games (all in start) against Zarya (Lugansk), Hajduk (Split, Croatia), Rabotnicki (Skopje, Macedonia), Sarajevo (Bosnia), Domžale (Slovenia), Triglav (Kranj, Slovenia).

On 27 July 2014, spent his first full official match, coming into the starting lineup of Metallurg in the match of the 1st round of the Ukrainian Championship League 2014/15 season against Shakhtar (Donetsk) (0:2).

On 21 January 2015, scored his first goal for the first team of Metallurg, in a friendly match against FC Okzhetpes (Kokshetau, Kazakhstan), at the training camp in Belek, Turkey.

International career
In early November 2014, he was among the 24 players called by Serhiy Kovalets (head coach) to training camp of the U-21 national team of Ukraine, which was officially announced on 6 November at the site of the Football Federation of Ukraine. He played the first official game for the U-21 team of Ukraine on 13 November 2014, against the youth team of Turkey (2:0).

Statistics

Club statistics

Apps and goals for the Ukraine U-21

References

External links
 
 
 Profile on the Ukrainian Premiere League

1994 births
Footballers from Kyiv
Living people

Ukrainian footballers
Ukraine under-21 international footballers
Association football midfielders
FC Metalurh Zaporizhzhia players
FC Kuban Krasnodar players
FC Olimpik Donetsk players
Gefle IF players
FCI Levadia Tallinn players
Ukrainian Premier League players
Russian Premier League players
Superettan players
Meistriliiga players
Oberliga (football) players
Ukrainian expatriate footballers
Expatriate footballers in Russia
Ukrainian expatriate sportspeople in Russia
Expatriate footballers in Sweden
Ukrainian expatriate sportspeople in Sweden
Expatriate footballers in Estonia
Ukrainian expatriate sportspeople in Estonia
Expatriate footballers in Germany
Ukrainian expatriate sportspeople in Germany